The Cork Junior A Hurling Championship (known for sponsorship reasons as the Co-Op Superstores Cork Junior A Hurling Championship and abbreviated to the Cork JAHC) is an annual hurling competition organised by the Cork County Board of the Gaelic Athletic Association and contested by the top-ranking junior clubs in the county of Cork in Ireland. It is the sixth tier overall in the entire Cork hurling championship system and is regarded as one of the toughest club competitions to win.

The Cork Junior Championship was introduced in 1895 as a countywide competition for teams deemed not eligible for the senior grade or second-string senior teams. At the time of its creation it was the second tier of Cork hurling.

In its current format, the Cork Junior A Championship begins in September following the completion of the seven Divisional Junior Championships. The 7 participating teams compete in a single-elimination tournament which culminates with the final match at Páirc Uí Rinn in October or November. The winner of the Cork Junior A Championship, as well as being presented with the John Quirke Cup, gains promotion to the Cork Premier Junior Hurling Championship.

The competition has been won by 72 teams, 28 of which have won it more than once. Carrigtwohill are the most successful team in the championships history, having won it 6 times. Erin's Own are the title holders, beating Kilshannig by 1-30 to 3-20 after extra time after a replay in the 2022 final.

History 
Officially known as the Cork Junior A Hurling Championship, it is regarded as one of the most hotly contested and most difficult to win of all the county championships. Established in 1895 as the "seconds championship", by the 1930s it developed along divisional lines due to the increased number of clubs participating.

The first championship took place in 1895 when Blackrock were crowned junior champions.

Format

Current Format
Quarter-finals: Six of the seven divisional champions compete in this round. The seventh divisional champion receives a bye to the next round. Three teams qualify for the next round, joining the seventh divisional champion.

Semi-finals: The two semi-finals feature the three quarter-final-winning teams and the team that receives a bye. Two teams qualify for the next round.

Final: The two semi-final winners contest the final. The winning team are declared champions.

2017-2019
First round: The seven divisional champions are seeded and are drawn to play the seven divisional runners-up. Repeat pairings from divisional finals are avoided in this round. Six teams qualify for the next round with one team receiving a bye.

Quarter-finals: The three quarter-finals feature the six first round-winning teams. Three teams qualify for the next round.

Semi-finals: The two semi-finals feature the three quarter-final-winning teams and the team that receives a bye from the first round . Two teams qualify for the next round.

Final: The two semi-final winners contest the final. The winning team are declared champions.

Teams

Qualification

Teams 
72 teams are expected to compete across the 7 divisional championships in 2023.

Trophy
The winning team is presented with the John Quirke Cup. Born in Milltown, County Kerry, Johnny Quirke (1911–1983) played hurling for Blackrock and was a member of the Cork senior hurling team for 14 years, during which time he won four successive All-Ireland Championships between 1941 and 1944. He served as a Cork selector for many years and was deeply involved at all levels with the Blackrock club.

Sponsorship
TSB Bank became the first title sponsor of the championship, serving in that capacity until 2005 when the Evening Echo signed a sponsorship deal. In 2020, Dairygold Co-Op Superstores were unveiled as the new title sponsor of the Cork Junior A Championship.

Roll of Honour

By Division

List of Finals

 1955 Aghabullogue and Castlelyons disqualified after meeting in the semi-final
 1942 Tracton and St. Finbarr's disqualified
 1935 The second replay abandoned due to weather conditions fifteen minutes from the end. The third replay abandoned a few minutes from time. Both teams suspended for two months and the championship declared null and void.

Records and statistics

Final

Team
Most wins: 6: 
Carrigtwohill (1896, 1915, 1941, 1948, 1966, 1994)
Most consecutive wins: 4:
Redmonds (1897, 1898, 1899, 1900)

Top scorers

In finals

References

Sources
 Cork Junior Hurling Champions
 Cork GAA – A History 1886–1986 Jim Cronin

 
3
Junior hurling county championships